Independence League Baseball is a collegiate summer baseball league in the United States with teams playing in Nebraska, North Dakota, South Dakota, and Wyoming. The league played its inaugural season in 2022 with ten teams and has eight teams for 2023.

History 
The league was announced in October 2021 with seven teams which were leaving the Expedition League:
 Badlands Big Sticks (Dickinson, North Dakota)
 Canyon County Spuds (Caldwell, Idaho)
 Casper Horseheads (Casper, Wyoming)
 Fremont Moo (Fremont, Nebraska)
 Hastings Sodbusters (Hastings, Nebraska)
 Spearfish Sasquatch (Spearfish, South Dakota)
 Western Nebraska Pioneers (Gering, Nebraska)

For the 2022 season, the league added the Gem City Bison (Laramie, Wyoming), the North Platte Plainsmen (North Platte, Nebraska), and the Nebraska Prospects, a traveling team to balance the schedule. The Western Nebraska Pioneers were the champions of the inaugural season.

For the 2023 season, the Oahe Zap were founded in Pierre, South Dakota while the North Platte Plainsmen and the Western Nebraska Pioneers left the league to play their own independent schedules. In December 2022, the Casper Horseheads ceased operations after four years in the two leagues and the Canyon County Spuds announced their relocation from Caldwell, Idaho to Casper, Wyoming to become the Casper Spuds. In January 2023, the Gem City Bison announced that they are skipping the 2023 season, citing "ongoing challenges", and that they will be "working diligently" to return in 2024. In February 2023, the Sawtooth Sockeyes (Caldwell, Idaho) joined the league as an unaffiliated, travel only team to help balance the schedule.

Teams

Current members

Former members

Membership timeline

Map

References

External links
 Official Website

Baseball leagues in Idaho
Baseball leagues in Nebraska
Baseball leagues in North Dakota
Baseball leagues in South Dakota
Baseball leagues in Wyoming
College baseball leagues in the United States
Sports leagues established in 2021
Summer baseball leagues